"Neverita" (English: "Little Cooler") is a song by Puerto Rican rapper Bad Bunny from his fifth studio album Un Verano Sin Ti (2022), which it appeared as the eighth track. The song was released on August 22, 2022, along with its music video as the seventh single from Un Verano Sin Ti. It is written by Benito Martínez and its production was handled by Tainy, Pelangaboy and Cheo Legendary.

On September 29, 2022, Puerto Rican singer Elvis Crespo released a merengue version of the song. Crespo performed the song at the 2022 Latin Billboard Music Awards.

Promotion and release
On May 2, 2022, Bad Bunny announced his fifth studio album, Un Verano Sin Ti, on which "Neverita" is placed at number eighth on the track list. On May 6, 2022, the song was released alongside the rest of Un Verano Sin Ti through Rimas Entertainment.

Chart performance
"Neverita" charted on the Billboard Hot 100 and on the Billboard Global 200 at numbers 31 and 16, respectively.

Audio visualizer
A 360° audio visualizer for "Neverita" was released on May 6, 2022, through YouTube along with the other audio visualizer videos of the songs that appeared on Un Verano Sin Ti.

Music video
The music video for "Neverita" was released on August 23, 2022, which pays a tribute to "Suavemente" by Elvis Crespo that was released in 1998 accompanied with its green-screen images and bright colors. At the end of the music video, a message is revealed - "In honor of the best video of all time".

Charts

Weekly charts

Year-end charts

Certifications

Notes

References

External links
 
 

2022 singles
Bad Bunny songs
Elvis Crespo songs
Spanish-language songs
2022 songs
Songs written by Bad Bunny